The 2015 Norwegian Figure Skating Championships was held at the Askerhallen in Asker from January 16 to 18, 2015. Skaters competed in the discipline of single skating.

Senior medalists

Ladies

Junior Medalists

Men

Ladies

External links
 2015 Norwegian Championships results
 Official website

Norwegian Figure Skating Championships
Norwegian Figure Skating Championships, 2015
2015 in Norwegian sport